Potato weed is a common name for several plants and may refer to:

 Galinsoga parviflora, a herbaceous plant in the Asteraceae (daisy) family
 Solanum esuriale, a species of perennial herbaceous plant native to Australia